The Carpenter Homestead is a historic colonial American house and farm in Seekonk, Massachusetts. Also known as Osamequin Farm, this  property includes a farmhouse and outbuildings whose construction history begins c. 1720. The main house, now a -story wood-frame structure with a gable-over-hip roof and central chimney, was begun c. 1720, underwent numerous alterations and expansions, and was given a historically sensitive restoration in the 1940s. The core portion of the main barn dates to the same time, with numerous additions in the intervening centuries, and also underwent restoration work in the 1940s. The property was under continuous ownership by the Carpenter family from its construction until 1939, and is one of Seekonk's oldest houses.

The property was listed on the National Register of Historic Places in 1993.

See also
National Register of Historic Places listings in Bristol County, Massachusetts

References

Houses completed in 1720
National Register of Historic Places in Bristol County, Massachusetts
Seekonk, Massachusetts
Rehoboth, Massachusetts
Houses in Bristol County, Massachusetts
Historic districts on the National Register of Historic Places in Massachusetts
1720 establishments in Massachusetts